This article is a list of accidents and incidents involving helicopters and which are notable enough to have an article on Wikipedia. It is grouped by the years in which the accidents and incidents occurred.

1968
22 May – Sikorsky S-61L N303Y, operating Los Angeles Airways Flight 841, suffers a mechanical failure in flight which allows the rotor blades to collide with the aircraft's fuselage. It crashes at Paramount, California, killing all 23 people on board.
14 August – Sikorsky S-61L N300Y, operating Los Angeles Airways Flight 417, loses a rotor blade in flight and crashes at Compton, California. All 21 people on board are killed.

1975
17 January – Sikorsky S-55B helicopter [[1975 Kjalarnes helicopter crash|crashes]] in Iceland while en route from Reykjavík Airport to Snæfellsnes.

1977
10 May – A Sikorsky CH-53 Yas'ur of the Israeli Air Force crashes in the Jordan Valley. All 54 people on board are killed.

1978
21 June – Two Boeing CH-47 Chinooks of the Imperial Iranian Air Force are shot down by the Soviet Air Defence Forces after straying into Turkmen Soviet Socialist Republic airspace. One aircraft is destroyed with the loss of eight lives. The other is damaged; it is later repaired with permission from Soviet authorities and returns to Iran.
26 June – Sikorsky S-61 LN-OQS of Helikopter Service loses a rotor blade in flight and crashes into the North Sea off Bergen, Norway. All eighteen people on board are killed.

1981
13 August – Westland Wessex G-ASWI of Bristow Helicopters suffers an engine failure and ditches in the North Sea off the coast of Norfolk, United Kingdom. All thirteen people on board are killed.

1982
23 July – Bell UH-1 Iroquois N87701 of Western Helicopters is damaged by pyrotechnic explosions while a scene for Twilight Zone: The Movie is being filmed at Indian Dunes, California. Actor Vic Morrow and two child actors are killed on the ground.
14 September – Bell 212 G-BDIL owned by Bristow Helicopters crashes while on a nighttime search and rescue mission in the North Sea, killing all six crew members on board.

1983
16 July – Sikorsky S-61 G-BEON of British Airways crashes into the Atlantic Ocean between the coast of Cornwall and the Isles of Scilly. Twenty of the 26 people on board are killed.

1986
18 June – Bell 206 N6TC of Helitech collides with Grand Canyon Airlines Flight 6 in mid-air over the Grand Canyon in Arizona, United States. All five people on board are killed, as are all twenty people on board the de Havilland Twin Otter that it collided with.
6 November – Boeing 234LR Chinook G-BWFC of British International Helicopters suffers a mechanical failure. The aircraft ditches at sea off Sumburgh Airport, Shetland Islands, killing 45 of the 47 people on board.

1988
13 July – Sikorsky S-61N G-BEID of British International Helicopters suffers an engine fire and ditches into the North Sea off the Shetland Islands. All 21 people on board are rescued.

1990
27 August – A Bell 206 helicopter crashes into the side of a ski slope in Elkhorn, Wisconsin, killing all five people on board including Stevie Ray Vaughan.

1991
4 April – A Bell 412 and Piper Aerostar collide in mid-air in a suburb of Philadelphia, Pennsylvania.  All five people on both aircraft, including United States senator John Heinz, along with two children on the ground, are killed.
25 October – A Bell 206 crashes into a high-voltage transmission tower near Vallejo, California, during bad weather. All three on board are killed, including Bill Graham.
20 November – A Mil Mi-8 belonging to the Azerbaijani Government is shot down by the Armenian military during the Nagorno-Karabakh War and crashes near Karakend. All 22 people on board are killed.

1992
28 January – An Azerbaijani Mil Mi-8 is shot down near Shusha by Armenian forces. All 44 people on board are killed.

1993
26 November – Aérospatiale AS 355 F1 ZK-HIT of the New Zealand Police collides in mid-air with Piper Archer ZK-ENX over Auckland. Both aircraft crash, killing all four people on board.

1994
2 June – Boeing Chinook HC2 ZD576 of the Royal Air Force crashes on the Mull of Kintyre, Argyll. All 29 people on board are killed.

1995
19 January – Aérospatiale AS332 Super Puma G-TIGK, operating Bristow Flight 56C is struck by lightning and ditches in the North Sea off the coast of Aberdeenshire. All eighteen people on board survive.

1997
4 February – Two Sikorsky S-65C-3 Yas'ur 2000s of the Israeli Air Force collide in mid-air over She'ar Yashuv and crash. All 73 people on board the two aircraft are killed.
8 September – Eurocopter AS332L Super Puma LN-OPG operating Helikopter Service Flight 451 suffers a mechanical failure and crashes into the Norwegian Sea. All twelve people on board are killed.

2001
17 September – A Mil Mi-8 of the Russian Armed Forces is shot down at Grozny, Chechnya. All thirteen people on board are killed.

2002
27 January – A Mil Mi-8 of the Russian Ministry of Internal Affairs is shot down near Shelkovskaya, Chechnya. All fourteen people on board are killed.
16 July – Sikorsky S-76A G-BJVX of Bristow Helicopters crashes into the North Sea off the coast of Norfolk following the loss of its rotor head in flight. All eleven people on board are killed.
19 August – A Mil Mi-26 of the Russian Air Force is shot down by Chechen separatists and crashes at Khankala, Chechnya. One hundred and twenty-seven people are killed.

2003
4 December – A Mil Mi-8 of the Polish Air Force crashes near Piaseczno. All fifteen people on board, including the Polish Prime Minister, Leszek Miller, survive.

2005
26 January – A Sikorsky CH-53E Super Stallion crashes while flying during a sandstorm in the Al-Anbar province of western Iraq, near the town of Ar-Rutbah. All 31 occupants were killed.
10 August – Sikorsky S-76C+ OH-HCI, operating Copterline Flight 103, crashes into Tallinn Bay. All fourteen people on board are killed.

2006
10 December – Bell 412SP N410MA of Mercy Air Services, Inc. crashes near Hesperia, California. All three people on board are killed.
27 December – Eurocopter AS365 Dauphin G-BLUN of CHC Helicopter crashes into Morecambe Bay. All six people on board are killed.

2007
5 March – An Aérospatiale AS 332C1 Super Puma collide in mid-air with a smaller Diamond DV20 Katana near the Zell am See Airport in Austria. All eight people on board the two aircraft were killed.
27 April – A Mil Mi-8 of the Russian Air Force crashes near Shatoy, Chechnya. All twenty people on board are killed.
3 June –  A Mil Mi-8 of Paramount Airlines crashes at Lungi, Sierra Leone. At least 21 of the 22 people on board are killed.
27 July – Two Eurocopter AS350 AStars collide in mid-air above Phoenix, Arizona. All four people on board the two aircraft are killed.
15 September  –  A Eurocopter AS350B2 Squirrel piloted by Scottish rally driver Colin McRae crashed at Lanark, Scotland. McRae's five-year-old son Johnny, and two family friends on board were killed.

2008
12 January – Mil Mi-17 transport helicopter belonging to the Armed Forces of the Republic of Macedonia crashes near the village of Blace, in the region of Katlanovo, approximately 10–15 kilometres south-east of Skopje. All 11 individuals aboard the helicopter, including eight passengers and three crew members, are killed.

2009
Eight of the ten people on board are killed.
12 March – A Sikorsky S-92 suffers a mechanical failure and ditches in the Atlantic Ocean off the coast of Newfoundland, Canada. Seventeen of the eighteen people on board are killed.
25 March – A Bell 206L-4 LongRanger crashes into Mount Keş, Turkey, killing all six people on board.
1 April – A Eurocopter AS332L2 Super Puma Mk 2 of Bond Offshore Helicopters suffers a mechanical failure and crashes into the North Sea off the coast of Aberdeenshire. All sixteen people on board are killed.
3 May – A Mil Mi-35 of the Venezuelan Army crashes in Táchira province. All eighteen people on board are killed.
3 July – A Pakistan Army Mil Mi-17 helicopter crashes in Khyber Pass, Pakistan, killing all 41 people on board.
8 August – A Eurocopter AS350 collides with a Piper PA-32R over the Hudson River between Hoboken, New Jersey and New York City, United States. The six occupants of the helicopter and the three occupants of the Piper aircraft all perish.
2 September – Andhra Pradesh Chief Minister Y. S. Rajasekhara Reddy's Bell 430 helicopter crashes, killing all five people on board.

2010

26 July – A Sikorsky CH-53 Yas'ur of the Israeli Air Force crashes in the Bucegi Mountains, Romania. All seven people on board are killed.

2011
19 April – Mil Mi-172 VT-PHF of Pawan Hans crashes on landing at Tawang, India. Seventeen of the 23 people on board are killed.
6 August – A Boeing CH-47 Chinook of the United States Military is shot down by a rocket propelled grenade in Afghanistan. All 38 people on board and a military dog are killed.

2012
10 June – A Eurocopter AS350 Écureuil of the Kenya Police crashes in the Ngong Forest. All six people on board are killed.
21 December – Mil Mi-8 RA-27003, operating as United Nations Flight 544, is shot down by the Sudan People's Liberation Army in a friendly fire incident. The aircraft crashes at Likuangole, South Sudan, killing all five people on board.

2013

16 January – Castle Air AgustaWestland AW109 G-CRST collides with a crane at Vauxhall, London and crashes. The pilot is killed, as is a pedestrian.
21 March – A  Eurocopter EC155 and a Eurocopter AS332 Super Puma collide on the ground near the Olympic Stadium in Berlin, leaving one crew member dead.
7 April – A Helipac Mil Mi8-PS crashes in the Loreto Region of Peru. All 13 people on board are killed.
2 July – Polar Airlines Mil Mi-8 RA-22657 crashes near Deputatsky, Russia. Twenty-four of the 28 people on board are killed.
23 August – A CHC Eurocopter AS332 Super Puma Mk 2 crashes into the sea 2 nm from Sumburgh in the Shetland Islands, Scotland while en route from Borgsten Dolphin oil platform. The accident kills four of the passengers; twelve other passengers and two crew were rescued.
29 November – A Police Scotland EC135 T2 crashes into a pub in Glasgow, Scotland. Three occupants of the aircraft are killed, as are seven pub patrons.

2014
13 March – AgustaWestland AW139 G-LBAL of Haughey Air crashes shortly after take-off from Gillingham, Norfolk, killing all four people on board
12 November – an Armenian Mil Mi-24 is shot down near Gəngərli village, Aghdam, Nagorno-Karabakh Republic, killing all three crew members.

2015
9 March – Two Eurocopter AS350B3 Ecureuils LQ-CGK and LQ-FJQ collide in mid-air and crash, killing all ten people on board.
10 March – A United States Army Sikorsky UH-60 Black Hawk crashes off the coast of the Florida Panhandle during a training exercise, killing all eleven people on board.
On 8 May 2015, a Pakistan Army Mi-17 crashes near the Naltar area of Gilgit in Gilgit-Baltistan, killing the Norwegian and Philippine ambassadors and the wives of the Malaysian and Indonesian ambassadors. Two Army pilots, Major Al-Tamash and Major Faisal, are also killed. The Polish and Dutch ambassadors are injured.
4 August – A UH-60 Black Hawk helicopter crashes in northwestern Colombia, killing 16 of the 18 people on board
21 November – A Eurocopter AS350D Astar helicopter crashes on Fox Glacier in the South Island of New Zealand, killing all seven people on board.

2016
14 January – Two U.S. Marine Corps CH53E helicopters collide off the coast of Oahu, Hawaii, killing all 12 passengers on board.
29 April – A CHC Helikopter Service Eurocopter EC225 crashes near Turøy, Norway. All thirteen people on board are killed.
26 June – A Colombian Army Mil Mi-17 crashes in mountainous terrain 180 km north-west of Bogota, killing all 17 passengers on board.
6 July 2016 – Prototype Bell 525 Relentless crashes near Italy, Texas, destroying the prototype Bell 525 Relentless helicopter and killing the two occupants.
21 October – A Skol Airlines Mil Mi-8 crashes''' in Siberia's Yamal Peninsula, killing 19 of the 22 people on board.

2017
10 March – A Sikorsky S-76 crashes in Istanbul, killing all seven people on board.
14 March – A Sikorsky S-92 crashes off County Mayo on Ireland′s west coast. All four crew members die.

2018
17 January – A Bell UH-1H Iroquois helicopter crashes and catches fire near Raton, New Mexico, killing five of the six people on board.
27 October – An AgustaWestland AW169 helicopter carrying Leicester City F.C. chairman Vichai Srivaddhanaprabha crashes and catches fire outside the King Power Stadium in Leicester, United Kingdom, killing all five people on board.

2020

26 January – A Sikorsky S-76 helicopter carrying retired basketball player Kobe Bryant, along with his 13-year-old daughter Gianna Maria "Gigi" Bryant, crashes outside of Calabasas, California, killing all nine on board.

2021
4 March – A Turkish Air Force (TAF) Eurocopter AS532 Cougar, en route to Tatvan District in Bitlis, Turkey, crashes in Bitlis Province. Eleven servicemen on board are killed in the crash, while two other servicemen survive.
5 March – A Robinson R44 helicopter carrying Botswana musician Sasa Klaas, crashes in the outskirts of Xumabee near Sojwe. Klaas is killed, but the pilot survives.
7 March – A Eurocopter AS350 Écureuil carrying French billionaire Olivier Dassault crashes shortly after takeoff in northwestern France near Deauville. Dassault and the pilot, the only people on board, are both killed.
 8 December – In the 2021 Indian Air Force Mil Mi-17 crash, a Mil Mi-17 helicopter carrying the Chief of Defence Staff of India General Bipin Rawat and 13 others crash near Coonoor in Tamil Nadu, killing all the 14 on board.

2023 

 2 January – Two Eurocopter EC130s collide near Sea World in Gold Coast, Queensland, Australia, killing four people and injuring eight.
 18 January - A Eurocopter EC225 Super Puma carrying the Minister of Internal Affairs of Ukraine, Denys Monastyrsky and other ministry officials, crashed at a kindergarten in Brovary, a suburb of Kyiv, Ukraine. The crash killed at least eighteen people, including Monastyrsky, while at least 29 others were injured.

References

Helicopters
Helicopter accidents